This page summarises the Champions Path matches of the 2021–22 UEFA Europa Conference League qualifying phase and play-off round.

Times are CEST (UTC+2), as listed by UEFA (local times, if different, are in parentheses).

Second qualifying round

Summary 

|+Champions Path

|}

Matches

Teuta won 3–2 on aggregate.

Riga won 3–0 on aggregate.

Maccabi Haifa won 7–2 on aggregate.

HB Tórshavn won 6–0 on aggregate.

Linfield won 4–0 on aggregate.

Fola Esch won 3–1 on aggregate.

Hibernians won 7–3 on aggregate.

Prishtina won 6–5 on aggregate.

Bodø/Glimt won 6–0 on aggregate.

Third qualifying round

Summary

|+Champions Path

|}

Matches

Maccabi Haifa won 7–3 on aggregate.

Fola Esch won 4–2 on aggregate.

Shamrock Rovers won 3–0 on aggregate.

Riga won 4–2 on aggregate.

Bodø/Glimt won 3–2 on aggregate.

Play-off round

Summary

|+Champions Path

|}

Matches

Bodø/Glimt won 3–2 on aggregate.

Maccabi Haifa won 7–3 on aggregate.

Flora won 5–2 on aggregate.

Lincoln Red Imps won 4–2 on aggregate.

Kairat won 7–2 on aggregate.

Notes

References

External links

1M